Lynn McDonald is a Canadian professor, activist and politician.

Lynn McDonald may also refer to:

Lynn McDonald (academic), Canadian social work academic
Lynn McDonald (psychologist), American psychologist

See also
Lyn Macdonald (1929–2021),  British military historian